Ronald B. Ellis (born July 24, 1952) is an American politician. He has served as a Republican member for the 47th district in the Kansas House of Representatives since 2017.

References

1952 births
Living people
Republican Party members of the Kansas House of Representatives
21st-century American politicians